Ratten is a municipality in the district of Weiz in the Austrian state of Styria.

Geography
Ratten lies about 25 km north of Weiz in the upper Feistritz valley.

References

Cities and towns in Weiz District